Ibn Abdur Rehman, also known as I.A. Rehman (1 September 1930 – 12 April 2021) was a Pakistani peace and human rights advocate, and a veteran communist. 

A protégé of the great Urdu poet Faiz Ahmed Faiz, he became chief editor of the Pakistan Times newspaper in 1989.  He was the founding chair of the Pakistan-India People's Forum for Peace and Democracy. He was also a director of the Human Rights Commission of Pakistan (HRCP) since 1990, and a prominent human rights activist. Rehman was influential for promoting peace in the Indo-Pakistani wars and conflicts and in Kashmir conflict as well as for other human rights issues in Pakistan.

In November 2007, on a visit to India, he told The Hindu "I've been working to defend people's human rights all my life. And, I will continue to do so."

In 2015, many human rights activists including I.A. Rehman urged the Pakistani government to 'criminalise child labour in hazardous environments'. According to Dawn, one activist doctor said, "I have seen cases where children have contracted tuberculosis because they worked in hazardous environments. Making children work such jobs should be criminalized."

Rehman was born in Haryana, British India. He grew up in both a "religious and secular" household, and his father and grandfather were landowners. He died in Lahore, Pakistan.

Awards and recognition
 Ramon Magsaysay Award for Peace and International Understanding in 2004
 Nuremberg International Human Rights Award in 2003

References

External links

1930 births
2021 deaths
Pakistani anti-war activists
Pakistani communists
Pakistani human rights activists
Pakistani male journalists
Pakistani pacifists
Pakistani people of Haryanvi descent
Ramon Magsaysay Award winners